Elgin was a burgh constituency that elected one commissioner to the Parliament of Scotland and to the Convention of Estates.

After the Acts of Union 1707, Elgin, Banff, Cullen, Inverurie and Kintore formed the Elgin district of burghs, returning one member between them to the House of Commons of Great Britain.

List of burgh commissioners

 1661–63: Andrew Leslie, bailie 
 1665 convention: Andrew Young 
 1667 convention: Robert Martins 
 1669–72: James Calder of Muirton
 1678 convention, 1685–86: David Stewart, baillie 
 1681–82: John Fyffe, councillor 
 1689–1701: James Stewart, dean of guild 
 1702–07: William Sutherland

References

See also
 List of constituencies in the Parliament of Scotland at the time of the Union

Politics of Moray
History of Moray
Constituencies of the Parliament of Scotland (to 1707)
Constituencies disestablished in 1707
Elgin, Moray
1707 disestablishments in Scotland